"Freedom Deep" is the fourth and final single from the 1993 album, Full Moon, Dirty Hearts, by Australian rock band INXS. The song was written by Andrew Farriss and Michael Hutchence.

"Freedom Deep" was played live at The Great Music Experience in Nara, Japan in May 1994 at the UNESCO Concert, the idea being to bring together Japanese and Western Music. The song arrangement was backed up by a unique selection of Japanese instruments which fitted in perfectly with the songs' musical style. Other artists at the Event were Bob Dylan, Bon Jovi and Joni Mitchell.

The single was only released in Japan and Australia, where it charted at #111 on the ARIA singles chart.

B-sides
The B-sides on maxi-CD single and cassette releases include three remixes of tracks on the Full Moon, Dirty Hearts album

Track listings
CD Maxi Single (4509957882)
 Freedom Deep (3:59)
 Please (You Got That …) (E-Smoove Club Mix) (8:01)
 Cut Your Roses Down (Sure Is Pure Mix) (6:55)
 Viking Juice (The Butcher Mix) (3:14)

Charts

References

1993 songs
1994 singles
INXS songs
Songs written by Andrew Farriss
Songs written by Michael Hutchence
Atlantic Records singles
East West Records singles
Song recordings produced by Mark Opitz